Events from the year 1740 in art.

Events
 October 13 – Jacques Saly arrives in Rome to study at the French Academy there.
 Susanna Drury exhibits gouache paintings of the Giant's Causeway in Ireland.

Works

 Canaletto
 A Regatta on the Grand Canal (National Gallery, London)
 Venice: The Basin of San Marco on Ascension Day (National Gallery, London)
 Venice: The Campo SS. Giovanni e Paolo (British Royal Collection, Windsor Castle)
 Venice: Santa Maria della Salute (Metropolitan Museum of Art, New York)
 Jean-Baptiste-Siméon Chardin – The Morning Toilette
 Matthäus Günther – Fresco in church of SS. Peter and Paul, Mittenwald, Bavaria
 William Hogarth – Portrait of Captain Thomas Coram
 James Latham – The Rt Hon. Sir Capel Molyneux
 Michele Marieschi – The Grand Canal at the Palazzo Foscari
 Philippe Mercier – Portrait of John Hall-Stevenson
 Peter Scheemakers – Monument to William Shakespeare in Westminster Abbey (designed by William Kent)

Births
 February 16 – Giambattista Bodoni, Italian typographer, type-designer, compositor, printer and publisher (died 1813)
 March 2 – Nicholas Pocock, English marine painter (died 1821)
 May 28 – Fedot Shubin, Russian sculptor (died 1805)
 September 7 – Johan Tobias Sergel, Swedish sculptor (died 1814)
 September 17 – John Hamilton Mortimer, British Neoclassical painter known primarily for his romantic paintings and Italian landscapes (died 1779)
 October 31 – Philip James de Loutherbourg, English miniaturist (died 1812)
 November 24 – John Bacon, British sculptor (died 1799)
 date unknown
 Innocente Alessandri, Italian engraver, born in Venice (died unknown)
 Margaret Bingham, British painter and writer (died 1814)
 William Beilby, British glassworker and enameller (died 1819)
 Claude André Deseine, French sculptor (died 1823)
 Edmund Garvey, Irish painter (died 1813)
 Charles-Étienne Gaucher, French engraver (died 1804)
 Nathaniel Grogan Irish painter from Cork (died 1807)
 William Marlow, English marine painter (died 1813)
 Nikola Nešković, Serbian religious painter of icons, frescoes, and portraits (died 1789)
 Mariano Ramon Sanchez, Spanish painter primarily of portrait miniatures (died 1822)
 probable
 John Smart, English painter of portrait miniatures (died 1811)
 Hugh Douglas Hamilton, Irish portrait artist (died 1808)
 Vincenzio Vangelisti, Italian engraver (died 1798)
 Antoine Vestier, French miniaturist and painter of portraits (died 1824)

Deaths
 January 30 – Amalia Königsmarck, Swedish painter (born 1663)
 February 23 – Massimiliano Soldani Benzi, Italian sculptor and medallist (born 1656)
 April 21 – Antonio Balestra, Italian Rococo painter (born 1666)
 May 18 – Giuseppe Palmieri , Italian painter (born 1674)
 June – Jan Frans van Bloemen, Flemish landscape painter (born 1662)
 July 16 – Jan Kupecký, Czech and Slovak portrait painter (born 1667)
 July 20 – Giuseppe Antonio Caccioli, Italian painter (born 1672)
 July 21 – Johann Evangelist Holzer, Austrian-German painter (born 1709)
 September 2 – Pietro Bianchi, Italian painter, active in Genoa and Rome (born 1694)
 November 22 – Georg Gsell, Swiss painter (born 1673)
 December 24 – Bernard Lens III, English artist known primarily for his portrait miniatures (born 1682)
 date unknown
 Francesco Costa, Italian painter of ornaments and quadratura (born 1672)
 Franz de Paula Ferg, Austrian landscape painter (born 1689)
 Francesco Fernandi, Italian painter (born 1679)
 Jean Joly, French sculptor (born 1650)
 Antonio Lorenzini, Italian painter and engraver (born 1655)
 Grigoriis Musikiysky, Russian painter (born 1670)
 Giacomo Pavia, Italian painter, active mainly in his native Bologna (born 1655)
 Giovanni Felice Ramelli, Italian miniaturist (born 1666)
 Arcangelo Resani, Italian painter of animals and hunted game (born 1670)
 Giuseppe Rivola, Italian painter (born unknown)
 Jacob van Huysum, Dutch botanical artist (born 1687)
 probable – Guglielmo da Leoni, Italian painter and engraver (born 1664)

 
Years of the 18th century in art
1740s in art